William Mitchell may refer to:

People

Media and the arts

 William Mitchell (sculptor) (1925–2020), English sculptor and muralist
 William Frederick Mitchell (1845–1914), British naval artist
 William M. Mitchell, American writer, minister and abolitionist
 W. O. Mitchell (1914–1998), Canadian writer
 W. R. Mitchell (William Reginald Mitchell, 1928–2015), British writer
 William Mitchell, former alias of actor Peter Finch
 William Paul Mitchell, known as Large Professor (born 1973), American hip hop producer

Politics and the law
 William Mitchell (1742–1823), Member of Parliament for Plympton Erle, 1796–1799
 William Mitchell (Australian politician) (1850–1923), member of the Queensland Legislative Assembly
 William Mitchell (barrister) (died 1937), Scottish Advocate and Liberal  politician
 William Mitchell (Burnley MP) (1838–1914), Conservative MP for Burnley, 1900–1905
 William Mitchell (Canadian politician) (1851–1926), Canadian senator
 William Mitchell (congressman) (1807–1865), congressman from Indiana
 William Mitchell (Huntingdonshire MP) (c. 1703–1745), Member of Parliament for Huntingdonshire, 1741–1745
 William Mitchell (North Dakota) (1830–1890), North Dakota Superintendent of Public Instruction
 William B. Mitchell (1832–1900), Justice of the Minnesota Supreme Court 
 William D. Mitchell (1874–1955), U.S. Attorney General
 William F. Mitchell (Wisconsin politician), Republican member of the Wisconsin State Assembly
 William Foot Mitchell (1859–1947), Conservative Party politician in England, MP 1910 and 1922–1929
 W. Franklin Mitchell, Republican politician from North Carolina, USA
 William Henry Mitchell (1834–1919), Washington state politician and businessman
 William Henry Fancourt Mitchell (1811–1884), Australian politician
 William W. Mitchell Sr. (1880–1969), American politician and businessman

Military
 William Mitchell (RAF officer) (1888–1944), senior Royal Air Force commander and Black Rod
 William Mitchell (Royal Navy officer) (c. 1745–1816), Royal Navy admiral
 Billy Mitchell (William Lendrum Mitchell, 1879–1936), American general and airpower advocate

Science and engineering
 William Mitchell (mathematician), set theorist, see Jónsson cardinal
 William Mitchell (physicist) (1925–2002), Oxford physicist who helped pioneer neutron scattering
 William A. Mitchell (1911–2004), corporate chemist responsible for Tang and Pop Rocks
 Bill Mitchell (automobile designer) (William L. Mitchell, 1912–1988), American automobile designer
 William McGregor Mitchell (1888–1970), Scottish veterinary surgeon

Sports
 William Mitchell (cricketer, born 1859) (1859–1929), English cricketer
 William Grant Mitchell (1865–1905), English international rugby union player
 John Mitchell (cricketer) (William John Mitchell, born 1947), Northern Districts cricketer

Other
 Bill Mitchell (economist) (William Francis Mitchell, born 1952), Australian economist
 William J. Mitchell (1944–2010), Australian-born American urban designer and architect
 W. J. T. Mitchell (born 1942), American historian
 William Mitchell (philosopher) (1861–1962), University of Adelaide professor, vice chancellor and chancellor, 1942–1948
 William Mitchell (missionary) (1803–1870), Anglican priest who established religious services in the Swan River Colony
 William Mitchell (Scottish entrepreneur) (1781–1854), co-founder of the Alloa Coal Company
 William Mitchell, a Black man involved in the 1839 Marion riot

Characters 
 President Bill Mitchell, fictional President of the United States in the film Dave
 Will Mitchell, fictional character in the BBC soap opera EastEnders

Institutions and companies
 William Mitchell College of Law, law school named for William B. Mitchell

See also
 Bill Mitchell (disambiguation)
 Billy Mitchell (disambiguation)
 Willie Mitchell (disambiguation)
 Sir William Lane-Mitchell (1861–1940), British Conservative Party politician
 William Michell (1796–1872), MP
 William Michell (MP for Derbyshire), see Derbyshire
 Michell